Sergey Vladimirovich Shilov (born 6 February 1988) is a Russian road racing cyclist, who most recently rode for UCI Continental team .

Career
Shilov has won two professional level races in his career, along with several others at lower levels. His first professional win came in the 2014 Volta a Portugal, where he won the bunch sprint on stage 8 in Castelo Branco. His second professional win came the following year with victory in a reduced bunch sprint in stage 2 of the 2015 Vuelta a Castilla y León.

In 2009, he was disqualified for two years due to doping.

Major results

Source:

2008
 9th Memorial Oleg Dyachenko
2010
 UEC European Under-23 Track Championships
1st  Team pursuit
3rd  Scratch
2012
 1st Stage 3 Volta ao Alentejo
 2nd  Team pursuit, 2012–13 UCI Track Cycling World Cup, Cali
 6th Memorial Davide Fardelli
 8th La Roue Tourangelle
 10th Klasika Primavera
2013
 4th Overall Vuelta Ciclista a León
1st Points classification
1st Stage 3
 10th Memorial Marco Pantani
2014
 1st Stage 8 Volta a Portugal
 3rd Gran Premio Industrie del Marmo
 4th Overall Giro del Friuli-Venezia Giulia
 5th Vuelta a La Rioja
2015
 1st  Team pursuit, 2015–16 UCI Track Cycling World Cup, Cali
 1st Stage 2 Vuelta a Castilla y León
 4th Overall Troféu Joaquim Agostinho
1st Prologue & Stage 2
 7th Overall GP Liberty Seguros
 7th Vuelta a La Rioja
 7th Klasika Primavera
 8th Overall East Bohemia Tour
 8th Memorial Marco Pantani
 9th Giro dell'Appennino
 10th Trofeo Matteotti
2016
 2nd Vuelta a La Rioja
 5th Klasika Primavera
2017
 1st Trofeo Matteotti
 1st Prueba Villafranca de Ordizia
 2nd  Team pursuit, 2016–17 UCI Track Cycling World Cup, Cali
 3rd  Team pursuit, 2017–18 UCI Track Cycling World Cup, Pruszków
 3rd  Team pursuit, UEC European Track Championships
 3rd Road race, National Road Championships
2018
 2nd  Team pursuit, 2017–18 UCI Track Cycling World Cup, Minsk
 9th Overall Boucles de la Mayenne
2019
 7th Giro dell'Appennino
2020
 National Road Championships
1st  Road race
2nd Time trial

References

External links

Russian male cyclists
1988 births
Living people
Doping cases in cycling
Russian sportspeople in doping cases
Universiade medalists in cycling
Universiade gold medalists for Russia
Medalists at the 2011 Summer Universiade